The  National Museum of Ghana is in the Ghanaian capital, Accra. It is the largest and oldest of the six museums under the administration of the Ghana Museums and Monuments Board (GMMB).

The museum building was opened on 5 March 1957 as part of Ghana's independence  celebrations. The official opening was performed by the Duchess of Kent, Princess Marina. The Museum's first Director was A.W. Lawrence.

Objects of archaeology, ethnography as well as fine art find place in the National Museum building.

Objects in the Archeology Section 
Objects in the archeology section range from the Stone Age period to the recent historical past. Those on permanent exhibition at the ethnography gallery include chief's regalia, indigenous Ghanaian musical instruments, gold weights, beads, traditional textiles, stools and pottery. There are also objects from  other African countries acquired through exchange. Examples are Senufo masks from Ivory Coast, Zulu wooden figures and bead-ware from Southern Africa. In addition there are also ancient Ife bronze heads from Nigeria and Bushongo carvings from the Congo. Exhibits at the small but impressive art gallery consist mainly of contemporary Ghanaian paintings executed in oils, pastels, acrylics, watercolours and collages. Apart from these there are sculpture pieces in different media.

References

External links

 old, archived Museum website
 National Museum of Ghana website

Government buildings completed in 1957
Museums in Ghana
Buildings and structures in Accra
Ghana
1957 establishments in Ghana
Museums established in 1957